Ib is a railway station in the Indian state of Odisha. It has the distinction of having the shortest name of all stations on the Indian Railways system.

Etymology
The station derives its name from the nearby Ib River.

History
Ib railway station started with the opening of the Nagpur–Asansol main line of Bengal Nagpur Railway in 1891. It became a station on the Howrah–Nagpur–Mumbai line in 1900.

Coalfield
In 1900, when Bengal Nagpur Railway was building a bridge across the Ib River, coal was accidentally discovered in what later became Ib Valley Coalfield.

See also
 Puratchi Thalaivar Dr. M.G. Ramachandran Central railway station – the station with the longest name on Indian Railways.

References

Railway stations in Jharsuguda district
Bilaspur railway division
Railway stations in India opened in 1891